Jiříkov is a municipality and village in Bruntál District in the Moravian-Silesian Region of the Czech Republic. It has about 300 inhabitants.

Administrative parts

Villages of Kněžpole, Křížov, Sovinec and Těchanov are administrative parts of Jiříkov.

Geography
It lies in the Nízký Jeseník highlands. The Oslava River flows along the western municipal border.

History
The first written mention of Jiříkov is from 1264. Jiříkov was probably founded as part of the colonization activities of the Olomouc Bishop Bruno von Schauenburg. In 1494 the village belonged to the Sovinec estate.

Of the original row of buildings, only a few houses remained after World War II. Today the old part of the village consists mostly of new buildings.

Sights
The baroque Church of Saint Michael the Archangel dates from 1787. Its prismatic renaissance tower dates from 1605.

In the village of Sovinec there is the Sovinec castle, built before 1332.

In popular culture
Jiříkov and its inhabitants play a major role in Bohdan Sláma's film The Wild Bees.

References

External links

Villages in Bruntál District